Different Drummer is a one-act ballet created by Kenneth MacMillan in 1984 for the Royal Ballet. The music is by Anton Webern (Passacaglia for orchestra, Op. 1) and Arnold Schoenberg (Verklärte Nacht). The story is based on the play Woyzeck by Georg Büchner.

The first performance was on 24 February 1984, at the Royal Opera House, Covent Garden.

Original cast
 Wayne Eagling
 Alessandra Ferri
 Stephen Jefferies
 Guy Niblett
 David Drew
 Jonathan Burrows
 Jonathan Cope
 Antony Dowson
 Ross MacGibbon
 Bruce Sansom
 Stephen Sheriff

Notes

Ballets by Kenneth MacMillan
Ballets to the music of Anton von Webern
1984 ballet premieres
Works based on Woyzeck